Chidobe Richard Awuzie (born May 24, 1995) is an American football cornerback for the Cincinnati Bengals of the National Football League (NFL). He was drafted by the Dallas Cowboys in the second round of the 2017 NFL Draft. He played college football at Colorado.

Early years
The son of Nigerian immigrants, Awuzie attended Oak Grove High School in San Jose, California. He played cornerback as well as wide receiver and was rated as a three-star recruit by both Rivals.com and ESPN.com.

As a junior, he tallied 23 carries for 249 yards, 3 touchdowns, 13 receptions for 211 yards and 4 touchdowns. As a free safety, he had 58 tackles, one interception returned 80 yards for a touchdown, one fumble recovery and 5 blocked kicks. He received All-League honors.

As a senior, he had 138 carries for 1,285 yards (third on the league), a 9.3-yard average and 14 touchdowns (first on the league), posting six 100-yard and two 200-yard games. He also had 18 receptions for 487 yards (two 100-yard games), 7 touchdowns, one pass completion for 38 yards and 128 total points (first on the league). On defense he played cornerback, making 69 tackles (3 for loss), 4 interceptions (2 returned for touchdowns), 12 passes defensed, 2 forced fumbles and 4 blocked kicks. He received All-League, PrepStar All-West Region, first-team All-Area and helped his team claim back-to-back BVAL Mount Hamilton Division titles.

He practiced basketball and track. He had career bests of 21.7 in the 200 metres and 22–1 in the long jump.

He committed to play college football for the University of Colorado Boulder, over offers from other Power 5 schools including Pac-12 opponents Utah and Washington State.

College career
Awuzie gained immediate playing time, appearing in 12 games, with 7 starts (six at the nickel position and one at left cornerback). He recorded 643 snaps on defense (third-most by a freshman in school history), 59 tackles (just the 13th freshman to record 50 or more tackles for a season), 5 tackles for loss, one quarterback sack, 4 passes defensed, 2 forced fumbles and a fumble recovery. He had 12 tackles against the University of Arizona.

As a sophomore, he started in the first 9 games, before missing last three with a lacerated kidney he suffered in practice. He tallied 64 tackles (2 for loss), 8 passes defensed (third on the team), 2 interceptions, one fumble recovery and one quarterback hurry.

As a junior, he appeared in 13 games (12 starts) at a combination between cornerback and the nickel position. He registered 90 tackles (second on the team), 78 solo tackles, 4 sacks (set record for the most by a CU defensive back), 2 interceptions, 10 passes defensed and had a team-high 13 tackles for loss, making it the first time a defensive back ever led in that category dating back to 1969 (when it was first tracked). He was named to the All-Pac-12 football team second-team.

Before his senior season, he was named to the Thorpe Award watchlist, annually given to best defensive back in the nation, as well as the Nagurski Award watchlist, which is given to the best defensive player in college football. He finished with 60 tackles (48 solo), 4 sacks (tying his own single-season record for CU defensive backs), one interception, 12 passes defensed and 2 forced fumbles.

Professional career
Awuzie received an invitation to the NFL Combine and completed all combine and positional drills. He also participated at Colorado's Pro Day along with Ahkello Witherspoon, Tedric Thompson, Sefo Liufau, and ten other teammates. He opted to only perform positional drills and had another attempt at the vertical jump for the 44 scouts and representatives from all 32 NFL teams. Awuzie had private workouts and visits with the Dallas Cowboys, Philadelphia Eagles, Oakland Raiders, and Tennessee Titans. NFL draft experts and analysts projected him to be a first or second round pick. He was ranked the fourth best cornerback in the draft by NFLDraftScout.com, the second best nickel back by NFL analyst Mike Mayock, the seventh best cornerback by ESPN, and was ranked the 15th best cornerback by Sports Illustrated.

Dallas Cowboys

2017
The Dallas Cowboys selected Awuzie in the second round (60th overall) of the 2017 NFL Draft. Awuzie was the 10th cornerback drafted in 2017. His selection is remembered by the intense speech that Drew Pearson gave amidst boos from the Eagles fans in attendance.
 
On May 11, 2017, the Dallas Cowboys signed Awuzie to a four-year, $4.28 million contract that includes a signing bonus of $1.25 million.

Throughout training camp, Awuzie competed to be a starting cornerback against Jourdan Lewis, Marquez White, Nolan Carroll, Orlando Scandrick, and Anthony Brown. He missed most of training camp with a hamstring and ankle injury. Head coach Jason Garrett named Awuzie the fourth cornerback to begin the regular season, behind Nolan Carroll, Orlando Scandrick, and Anthony Brown.

He made his professional regular season debut in the Dallas Cowboys’ season-opener against the New York Giants and made four combined tackles during a 19–3 victory. On September 17, 2017, Awuzie earned his first career start after Orlando Scandrick sustained a fractured hand the following week. Unfortunately, Awuzie sustained a hamstring injury during the Cowboys’ 42–17 loss at the Denver Broncos. Awuzie was inactive for the next two games (Weeks 3–4) due to the injury. He returned during the Cowboys’ Week 5 loss against the Green Bay Packers, but further re-injured his hamstring and was subsequently sidelined for the next four games (Week 7–10). Awuzie supplanted Anthony Brown as a starting cornerback for the last five games due to consistent penalties. In Week 15, he collected a season-high five combined tackles and one pass deflection during a 20–17 victory at the Oakland Raiders. On December 31, 2017, Awuzie recorded two solo tackles, deflected a pass, and made his first career interception during a 6–0 victory at the Philadelphia Eagles in Week 17. Awuzie intercepted a pass by Eagles’ quarterback Nick Foles, that was initially intended for wide receiver Alshon Jeffery, during the first quarter. He finished his rookie season in 2017 with 25 combined tackles (14 solo), seven pass deflections, one interception, and one forced fumble in ten games and six starts.

2018
Awuzie retained his role as a starting cornerback in 2018 and began the season alongside Byron Jones. In Week 2, he collected a season-high eight solo tackles during a 20–13 win against the New York Giants. He was inactive during a Week 6 win against the Jacksonville Jaguars due to an ankle injury. Awuzie finished with season with 71 combined tackles (57 solo), 11 pass deflections, one interception, and one forced fumble in 15 games and 14 starts. He received an overall grade of 65.1 from Pro Football Focus, which ranked 65th among all qualifying cornerbacks in 2018.

The Dallas Cowboys finished first in the NFC East with a 10–6 record and earned a playoff berth. On January 5, 2019, Awuzie started his first career playoff game and made six combined tackles and broke up a pass attempt during a 24–22 win against the Seattle Seahawks during a NFC Wildcard Game.

2019
In week 4 against the New Orleans Saints, Awuzie made an acrobatic interception off a pass from Teddy Bridgewater in the 12–10 loss.

2020
In Week 1 against the Los Angeles Rams, Awuzie recorded his first interception of the season off pass thrown by Jared Goff during the 20–17 loss. He was placed on injured reserve on September 26, 2020 with a hamstring injury. He was activated on November 10, 2020. He was placed on the reserve/COVID-19 list by the team on December 10, 2020, and activated on December 16.

Cincinnati Bengals
On March 19, 2021, Awuzie signed a three-year contract with the Cincinnati Bengals.

2021
Awuzie played in fourteen (14) games for the Cincinnati Bengals in 2021 recording two (2) interceptions, fourteen (14) passes defended, and fifty-three (53) tackles.  

In Super Bowl LVI, Awuzie recorded his first career playoff interception off Rams' quarterback Matthew Stafford.

2022
In Week 8 against the Cleveland Browns, Awuzie suffered a torn ACL ending his season. He played in eight games in 2022, recording five passes defended and 29 tackles.

Personal life

Awuzie is a Christian. Awuzie has said, “My faith is everything. A testament to God always and His grace and mercy in my life, I’m a living testimony of that. In everything I do, I treat football like a platform to open eyes to the faith of Christianity and accepting Jesus Christ as our Savior.”

Awuzie is an avid chess player who commonly plays 1. e4 and plays on Chess.com. He has compared his chess game to his play on the football field as a cornerback, comparing himself to a fianchettoed bishop. He also says chess helps him in his daily life and in making connections with others. In July 2022, he won Chess.com's BlitzChamps tournament, a rapid tournament for NFL players, beating former Cowboys teammate Amari Cooper in the final.

References

External links
 Colorado Buffaloes bio
 Dallas Cowboys bio

1995 births
Living people
American sportspeople of Nigerian descent
Players of American football from San Jose, California
American football cornerbacks
Colorado Buffaloes football players
Dallas Cowboys players
Cincinnati Bengals players
Christians from California